Motiur Rahman Munna (born 1 September 1979) is a retired Bangladeshi footballer who played as a central midfielder. He played for the Bangladesh national team from 1999 to 2009. Motiur spent most of his club career captaining Mohammedan SC, where he won several trophies. He also played for Brothers Union, Muktijoddha Sangsad KC and Abahani Limited Dhaka during his 14-year club career.

International career
On 22 April 1999, Motiur made his debut for the national team against  India during the 1999 SAFF Championship. Motiur's first goal for the country came during the 2000 AFC Asian Cup qualifiers against Sri Lanka. He was also part of the 2003 SAFF Cup winning team, his goal against India during extra time helped Bangladesh advance into the finals of the tournament. After earning 41 caps for Bangladesh, he retired from international football in 2011.

International goals
Scores and results list Bangladesh's goal tally first.

Bangladesh U23

Bangladesh

Honours

Club

Mohammedan SC
 Dhaka League: 2002
 National Championship: 2001–02, 2005–06

International

Bangladesh
SAFF Championship: 2003

References

Living people
1979 births
Bangladeshi footballers
Bangladesh international footballers
Association football midfielders
Bangladesh Football Premier League players
Mohammedan SC (Dhaka) players
Brothers Union players
Abahani Limited (Dhaka) players
Muktijoddha Sangsad KC players